Stuart Douglas Barnes (born December 25, 1970) is a Canadian former professional ice hockey forward. He played 16 seasons at centre in the NHL with the Winnipeg Jets, Florida Panthers, Pittsburgh Penguins, Buffalo Sabres, and Dallas Stars. He currently has an arena named after him in the city of Spruce Grove, where he was born. Barnes was an assistant coach with the Dallas Stars. , he is the head coach and co-owner of the Tri-City Americans in the Western Hockey League.

Playing career
Barnes was drafted fourth overall by the Winnipeg Jets in the 1989 NHL Entry Draft. On November 25, 1993, the Jets traded him along with a sixth round selection (previously acquired from the St. Louis Blues; Chris Kibermanis) in 1994 to the Florida Panthers for Randy Gilhen. In Florida, he was among the leaders on the teams, who helped carry the Panthers to the 1996 Stanley Cup Finals, facing the Colorado Avalanche. Then on November 19, 1996, the Pittsburgh Penguins traded Chris Wells to the Panthers for Barnes and Jason Woolley. The trade to the Penguins has been considered the worst in Panthers history.

In 1999, Barnes was traded to the Buffalo Sabres for Matthew Barnaby. In Buffalo, he went to the Finals again, this time against Dallas, only to lose on a triple-overtime goal by Brett Hull. He served as the captain for the Sabres before being traded to the Stars in 2003 for Michael Ryan and a second round draft pick in the 2003 NHL Entry Draft. When Mike Modano was injured during the 2006–07 season, Barnes served as an alternate captain of the Stars. He also served as an alternate captain for most of the 2007–08 season due to Sergei Zubov's absence from the line-up.

Barnes announced his retirement as a player on August 28, 2008 and joined the Stars as an assistant coach for three seasons before becoming a hockey operations consultant.

Barnes left the Stars front office after the 2012–13 season, and went on to serve in a dual capacity as the Tri-City Americans co-owner in the Western Hockey League and as the head coach of the Okanagan Academy Prep hockey team.

In 2017, Barnes returned to the Dallas Stars organization as an assistant coach.

Career statistics

Regular season and playoffs

International

Awards and honours

Transactions
On June 17, 1989 the Winnipeg Jets selected Stu Barnes in the first round (#4 overall) of the 1989 NHL draft.
On November 25, 1993 the Winnipeg Jets traded Stu Barnes and a 1994 sixth round pick to the Florida Panthers in exchange for Randy Gilhen and a 1994 fourth round pick.
On July 19, 1994 the Florida Panthers re-signed Stu Barnes to a multi-year contract.
On July 16, 1996 the Florida Panthers signed Stu Barnes to a multi-year contract.
On November 19, 1996 the Florida Panthers traded Stu Barnes and Jason Woolley to the Pittsburgh Penguins in exchange for Chris Wells.
On June 20, 1998 the Pittsburgh Penguins re-signed Stu Barnes.
On March 11, 1999 the Pittsburgh Penguins traded Stu Barnes to the Buffalo Sabres in exchange for Matthew Barnaby.
On September 23, 1999 the Buffalo Sabres re-signed restricted free agent Stu Barnes to a multi-year contract.
On March 10, 2003 the Buffalo Sabres traded Stu Barnes to the Dallas Stars in exchange for Michael Ryan and a 2003 second round pick (#65 - Branislav Fabry).
On August 3, 2004 the Dallas Stars re-signed Stu Barnes to a 2-year contract extension.
On June 7, 2007 the Dallas Stars re-signed Stu Barnes to a 1-year contract.
On August 28, 2008 Stu Barnes announced his retirement and was hired as assistant coach of the Dallas Stars for a 2-year contract.
On July 13, 2010 Stu Barnes was re-signed as assistant coach of the Dallas Stars for a 2-year contract.

See also
List of NHL players with 1000 games played

References

External links

1970 births
Living people
Buffalo Sabres captains
Buffalo Sabres players
Canadian ice hockey centres
Dallas Stars coaches
Dallas Stars personnel
Dallas Stars players
Florida Panthers players
Ice hockey people from Alberta
Moncton Hawks players
National Hockey League first-round draft picks
New Westminster Bruins players
People from Spruce Grove
Pittsburgh Penguins players
St. Albert Saints players
Tri-City Americans players
Winnipeg Jets (1979–1996) draft picks
Winnipeg Jets (1979–1996) players
Canadian ice hockey coaches